Richard Gardiner was Dean of St Patrick's Cathedral, Dublin  from 1238 until 1250.

References

Deans of St. Patrick's Cathedral, Dublin
13th-century Irish Roman Catholic priests